This is a list of Danish television related events from 1986.

Events
22 February - Lise Haavik is selected to represent Denmark at the 1986 Eurovision Song Contest with her song "Du er fuld af løgn". She is selected to be the nineteenth Danish Eurovision entry during Dansk Melodi Grand Prix held at the DR Studios in Copenhagen.

Debuts

Television shows

Births
21 January - Johannes Nymark, actor & singer
26 September - Stephania Potalivo, actress

Deaths

See also
1986 in Denmark